Tom Dickey was an American sailor. In 1971 Dickey together with helmsman Robert Mosbacher, and Thad Hutcheson won the Soling Gulf Coast Regionals, then the Soling North American Championship, and the Soling World Championship.

References

1946 births
2019 deaths
American male sailors (sport)
North American Champions Soling
Soling class world champions